Hainzl Industriesysteme GmbH is an Austrian company situated in Linz, Upper Austria. The system provider in the fields of fluid and drive technology, handling and automation technology, and building technology   is mainly active in the business areas of mechanical engineering, plant engineering, vehicle construction, the energy industry, and building and infrastructure construction.

History 
The company Hainzl & Bauer was established in 1965 in Linz-Urfahr, where the first units were produced on a farm. In 1970, the company moved to its current location at the Linzer Industriezeile. In 1980, the company hired its 100th employee. Five years later, the Hainzl family acquired 100% of the company and rebranded it as HAINZL INDUSTRIAL SYSTEMS. Since then, the office and production area has been successively developed, with the last expansion taking place in 2009. In 1993 the company Kappa Filter Systems was founded in Steyr (Upper Austria) in conjunction with Klaus Kröger for the maintenance of pure air in industry. Also in 1993, HAINZL started with the development of fire-fighting systems with high-pressure water mist, which are offered under the brand “Aquasys”.

In 2014, HAINZL employed 730 people and had a turnover exceeding EUR 130 million.

Fields of activity 
Hainzl develops products and services based on: 
 Hydraulics
 Elektro mechanics
 Elektronic systems & telematics
 Machine & plant automation
 Optimization of machine & plant energy
 Handling & robotic systems
 Process & spray technology
 Building technology

External links 
 Website Hainzl GmbH

References 

Companies based in Linz
Economy of Upper Austria
Manufacturing companies of Austria